North Springfield is an unincorporated community and census-designated place in the town of Springfield, Windsor County, Vermont, United States. As of the 2010 census, the population of the CDP was 573. It lies at an altitude of 495 feet (151 m). A post office has been operated in North Springfield since 1832. Black River Produce, a major food processor and distributor, is headquartered in the village.

It is the location of the Stellafane Observatory, which is a National Historic Landmark.

References

Census-designated places in Vermont
Census-designated places in Windsor County, Vermont